The 2009 Isle of Wight Council elections were held on Thursday 4 June 2009.

After a review by the Local Government Boundary Commission for England, the number of seats on the council was reduced from 48 single-member wards, to a 40-member council, consisting of 38 single member wards, and one double-member ward.



Overview
The result of the election was 'no change', with the Conservatives retaining an overall majority by winning twenty-four of the forty seats available. Of the sixteen remaining seats, ten went to independents, five to the Liberal Democrats and just one to the Labour Party. Although the Conservatives managed to retain control, the Isle of Wight was still the only council in England in which they lost seats. Among the factors which could have led to this relatively poor performance are the recent education reforms on the Isle of Wight, which led to protests over the closure of island primary schools. The "Standards not Tiers" independent candidate Chris Welsford beat the sitting Conservative councillor Jonny Fitzgerald-Bond by 141 votes in the Ventnor East ward. In the Cowes West and Gurnard ward, which was at the heart of education reforms, sitting Tory councillor Alan Wells was beaten by independent candidate Paul Fuller. The large numbers of independent candidates standing at this election and the increased level of support for them could also be attributed to the ongoing United Kingdom Parliamentary expenses scandal, pushing voters away from the mainstream political parties represented in the House of Commons.

Results

The party standings following the election:

Ward results
The following are results from each electoral ward.

See also

 Politics of the Isle of Wight
 2009 United Kingdom local elections

References

2009 English local elections
2009
21st century on the Isle of Wight